Edenton Peanut Factory, also known as Edenton Peanut Company, is a historic peanut factory building located at Edenton, Chowan County, North Carolina. It was built about 1909, and is a five-story, brick factory building with a six-story elevator tower and attached engine room.  Also on the property is a contributing storage warehouse.

It was listed on the National Register of Historic Places in 1979.

References

Industrial buildings and structures on the National Register of Historic Places in North Carolina
Industrial buildings completed in 1909
Buildings and structures in Chowan County, North Carolina
National Register of Historic Places in Chowan County, North Carolina